The Journal of Translational Medicine is a peer-reviewed open-access medical journal published by BioMed Central since 2003. The editor-in-chief is Francesco Marincola. According to the Journal Citation Reports, the journal had a 2021 impact factor of 8.440.

References

External links

General medical journals
Creative Commons Attribution-licensed journals
BioMed Central academic journals
Publications established in 2003
English-language journals
Translational medicine